Reel to Real is the fourth EP release by  English alternative rock band Swervedriver. Produced and recorded by the band and Alan Moulder, it was promotionally released in 1991, through A&M Records.

Background
The promotional EP features the song "Sandblasted" which was released as a single and included on the EP of the same name. The EP also features a cover of The Velvet Underground song, "Jesus", written by Lou Reed and included on the band's self-titled 1969 album.

Critical reception

Andy Kellman of Allmusic described the Velvet Underground cover as "a decent, drums-heavy version" and referred to the acoustic-driven track "Hands," as "another dandy in Swervedriver's arsenal of 'on a motorbike in the middle of nowhere' epics." Kellman also argued that "'Scrawl and Scream' is a slower, slightly twangy version of Rave Down's 'Afterglow' with different lyrics" and deemed that "it's not as effective as its predecessor," while Joe Tangari of Pitchfork described it as "a wicked, steel guitar-soaked headrush."

Track listing
All tracks written by Swervedriver, except "Jesus", written by Lou Reed.
 "Sandblasted" –  5:41
 "Scrawl and Scream" – 3:50
 "(The Watchmakers) Hands" – 3:30
 "Jesus" (The Velvet Underground cover) – 4:17

Personnel

Swervedriver
 Adam Franklin – vocals, guitar
 Jimmy Hartridge – guitar
 Adi Vines – bass guitar 
 Graham Bonnar – drums

Other personnel
 Patrick Arbuthnot – pedal steel guitar (2)
 Alan Moulder – production (2); engineering (2); mixing (2, 3)
 Philip Ames – engineering (1, 3)
 Nick Robbins – engineering (4)
 Anjali Dutt – mixing (1)
 Swervedriver – production

References

External links
 

1991 EPs
Swervedriver EPs
A&M Records EPs
Shoegaze EPs
Albums produced by Alan Moulder